= Volleyball European Championships =

Volleyball European Championships may refer to

- Men's European Volleyball Championship
- Women's European Volleyball Championship
